Raj Nidimoru and Krishna D.K., collectively known as Raj & DK, is an Indian filmmaking duo. They are best known for their television work, specifically as creators, directors, writers, and producers of spy thriller show The Family Man (2019-present) and black comedy crime thriller TV series  Farzi (2023-present).
 
Apart from television shows, they have directed the films 99 (2009), Shor In The City (2011), Go Goa Gone (2013), Happy Ending (2014) and A Gentleman (2017).

Early life 
Raj Nidimoru and Krishna D.K. were born and brought up in Tirupati and Chittoor, Andhra Pradesh, respectively. Their mother tongue is Telugu. They both graduated from Sri Venkateswara University College of Engineering, where they also met. After graduation, they emigrated to the U.S. to pursue a career in software engineering.

Career
Raj & DK's first Hindi feature film, 99, was an original crime-comic-thriller-historical-fiction set in Mumbai and Delhi. The New York Times called it "funny, inventive, refreshing"; Box Office magazine (USA) acclaimed that the film "sets new standards in Hindi cinema!"; and a number of Indian publications gave it four star reviews. Rediff.com gave the film 4 stars and told the viewers that "they will leave the theater laughing and entertained." Indiatimes gave it 3.5 stars.

Their next, Shor in the City, was the acclaimed Hindi film of the year. It has received glowing reviews from across media publications. The film was made at a micro-budget, making it profitable even before the film's release. The film was also selected to various high-profile film festivals across the world. Nikhat Kazmi of The Times of India awarded it four stars out of five and stated "With a zany screenplay (Raj Nidimoru and Krishna DK), excellent cinematography by Tushar Kanti Ray and peppy music by Sachin-Jigar, Shor in the City is another breaking-norm film from Ekta Kapoor".Taran Adarsh of Bollywood Hungama gave it three and a half stars and wrote "Shor in the City belongs to one of those rare categories of movies with sensibilities that would not only entice the festival crowd and the cinema literate, but also lure the ardent moviegoer." Aniruddha Guha of the Daily News and Analysis gave it three stars and said "Shor in the City is the kind of reassuring film you yearn to watch amid, well, what 'Bollywood' has to offer every week. Also, it articulates something you have only probably thought before – 'Karma IS a bitch.'"Rajeev Masand of CNN-IBN awarded three and a half stars saying "A delicious mix of quirky humor, gruesome violence, and surprising sensitivity, Shor in the City works on the strength of its smart script and consistent performances from its ensemble cast."Rediff awarded the film four stars and said "Raj-Krishna's Shor in the City robotically registers itself in Indian cinema's history."Anupama Chopra of NDTV gave the movie four stars and wrote "Shor in the City is a terrific film. It’s surprising and disturbing and has a vein of rich, dark humor coursing through it." Shubhra Gupta of the Indian Express gave it a three star rating and commented "What makes Shor in the City an instant clutter-breaker is its darkly comic treatment. It makes you smile because its humour comes from within. It’s not grafted. And it’s got heart : we feel for the characters." Tushar Joshi of MiD DAY gave it a four star rating and wrote "Loaded with humor, sarcasm and wit. That truly is the beauty of the makers who succeed in arresting you with their tales. The spectacular climax is easily one of the best written in recent times." Karan Anshuman of Mumbai Mirror gave it a four star rating, saying "Three stories, eleven days, myriad layers, believable characters, fine performances, spirited direction, taut script, momentary explosions of originality."

Several years later, they came back with Go Goa Gone, which was a clutter-breaking film that introduced to India the first of its kind of a genre-bending film - a stoner/slacker comedy combined with horror and comedy. It became a cult film, especially among the younger audience. 

In 2021, they started subsidiary of their production company, D2R Indie to produce indie films. The first project produced under the banner was the 2021 Telugu film Cinema Bandi by debutant director Praveen Kandregula. It received positive response from critics and audience. LetsOTT cited the film as "an utterly delectable, charming, that rises a toast to the magic of cinema." Another reviewer writing to NTV, stated "Cinema Bandi toys with themes like hope and redemption. While the premise is heart-warming, the treatment could have been way better." Ramnath Nandini of Scroll.in wrote that "the [film] has a winning set-up, oodles of heart and snarky humour, which compensate for the unstructured and rambling narrative and simplistic approach." Gautaman Bhaskaran of News18 agave a rating of 2.5/5 and wrote that "Cinema Bandi has a very interesting message about how video cameras have afforded splendid opportunities for especially short moviemakers, the film appears rather raw." Hindustan Times'''s Haricharan Pudipeddi said that the film is rooted in reality and it brims with the kind of energy we rarely witness in mainstream cinema.

They have also signed for the Indian segment of Citadel'' by Russo Brothers whose production is expected to begin in 2022. More recently, they signed a multi-year deal with Netflix.

Filmography

Film

Television

Awards
Filmfare OTT Awards
 Best Series (Critics) - The Family Man
 Best Director (Critics) - Raj & DK (The Family Man)
 Best Dialogues (Critics) - Raj & DK, Suman Kumar, Sumit Arora (The Family Man)

Star Screen Awards
 Best Film 2018 - Stree

References

External links

Indian filmmaking duos
Indian screenwriting duos
Living people
Film directors from Andhra Pradesh
Telugu film directors
20th-century births
Hindi-language film directors
Indian emigrants to the United States
Telugu film producers
Year of birth missing (living people)
21st-century Indian film directors
People from Chittoor district
Film producers from Andhra Pradesh